4R may refer to:

 4R Family restaurants in Northern California
 Galaxy 4R, a Panamsat-owned communications satellite
 Ponceau 4R, a synthetic colourant
 Hamburg International airline's IATA code
 Nachtjagdgeschwader 2, from its historic Geschwaderkennung code with the Luftwaffe in World War II
 Sri Lanka aircraft registration
 A standard consumer print size for photographs. See Standard photographic print sizes
 the Railroad Revitalization and Regulatory Reform Act, also known as the "4R Act"
 the short-lived acronym for Neljä ruusua ('Four Roses'), a Finnish band, aiming for a broader international appeal
4R, the production code for the 1977 Doctor Who serial The Robots of Death

See also 
 The four Rs (disambiguation)
 specifically Reduce, Reuse, Recycle, Replace, as in waste hierarchy - for instance in Hong Kong
 R4 (disambiguation)